Lieoux is a commune in the Haute-Garonne department in southwestern France.

Until the end of 1973, Lieoux was a commune in its own right, but on January 1, 1974, it was merged with the commune of Saint-Gaudens.  It became a separate commune again on February 13, 2008.

Population

See also
Communes of the Haute-Garonne department

References

Communes of Haute-Garonne